The Huntress is a 1923 American drama film directed by Lynn Reynolds and written by Percy Heath. It is based on the 1922 novel The Huntress by Hulbert Footner. The film stars Colleen Moore, Lloyd Hughes, Russell Simpson, Walter Long, C.E. Anderson, and Snitz Edwards. The film was released on August 20, 1923, by Associated First National Pictures.

Cast

Production
This was the first of five films, in three years, with Moore and Hughes starring in the lead roles. They also appeared together in Sally (1925), The Desert Flower (1925), Irene (1926), and Ella Cinders (1926).

Preservation
With no prints of The Huntress located in any film archives, it is a lost film.

References

External links

1923 films
1920s English-language films
Silent American drama films
1923 drama films
First National Pictures films
Films directed by Lynn Reynolds
American silent feature films
American black-and-white films
1920s American films